Ye Olde Space Bande is the second album by the Moog Cookbook, released in 1997. It is a selection of covers of classic rock tracks remade using Moog synthesizers and other analog synthesizers.

Track listing

References

1997 albums
The Moog Cookbook albums
Restless Records albums
Covers albums